Gościeradów is a village in Kraśnik County, Lublin Voivodeship, in eastern Poland. It is the seat of the gmina (administrative district) called Gmina Gościeradów.

The village has a population of 960.

References

Villages in Kraśnik County